The Department for External Church Relations of the Moscow Patriarchate (DECR) (until August 2000: Department for External Church Relations) is one of the synodal institutions of the Russian Orthodox Church. It was established on 4 April 1946.

History

Creation 
On 20 September 1918, the Local Council of the Russian Orthodox Church "for the sake of resolving difficulties on the path to unity and to possibly facilitate [...] the achievement of the ultimate goal" (that is, restoring unity and communication) instructed the Synod to form a standing commission under the Synod with branches in Russia and far abroad to interact with non-Eastern-Orthodox churches. However, it was not possible to establish that Commission.

On 4 April 1946, by decision of the Holy Synod of the Russian Orthodox Church, the Department for external church relations was formed and had as its goal "the management of foreign institutions of the Russian Orthodox Church (dioceses, parishes, exarchates, metropolitan districts, spiritual missions, etc.; relations with autocephalous Eastern Orthodox Churches; correspondence with foreign institutions; processing of foreign correspondence: translation into Russian, preparation of answers, preparation of archival and scientific references; preparation of reports on all fundamental issues arising in connection with the management of foreign institutions, the relationship of the Russian Church with other autocephalous Churches and the leadership of non-Eastern-Orthodox religions".

According to David Gzgyan, member of the : "under the new Patriarch, Alexy I, in 1945 a special body was created in the structure of the Moscow Patriarchate: the Department for External Church Relations [...] since then, its head has been the 'person number two' of the Russian Orthodox Church. This situation is unique in the whole history of the church throughout the world: the key role in the activities of the Church belonged to the department of external relations, which normally should occupy the most modest place. Today, the DECR, of course, is not the same, but the general veil of "special status" remains. In the second half of the 1940s, the Department was allocated colossal funds to carry out numerous contacts with the Middle Eastern patriarchates and churches of Europe, including non-Eastern-Orthodox (for example, Anglican). In addition, it was given a large-scale task: to create an anti-Vatican block."

The work to strengthen the department in 1960-1961 was carried out by the  under the Council of Ministers of the USSR, "fulfilling the decision of the Central Committee of the CPSU of July 25, 1960."

In accordance with the decision of the Holy Synod of 16 March 1961, the head of the department should always be in the episcopal dignity and a permanent member of the Holy Synod of the Russian Orthodox Church.

From 1967 (or 1965) to 2009, the DECR of the MP published the Information Bulletin of the Department for External Church Relations of the Moscow Patriarchate. The newsletter gave information on international church contacts, the most significant events concerning the Russian Orthodox Church and other local and non-Eastern-Orthodox churches, as well as reviews of articles published in foreign church periodicals, etc.

On December 16, 1969, the Holy Synod decided: "1. To establish in Kiev under the Exarch of Ukraine a branch of the Department for External Church Relations of the Moscow Patriarchate; 2. The Chairperson of the branch shall be His Grace Metropolitan of Kiev and Galicia, Exarch of Ukraine."

1970s to 2009 
On July 25, 1979, by the decision of the Holy Synod in Leningrad, another branch of the DECR was established under the Metropolitan of Leningrad and Novgorod.

On 21 August 1997, in connection with the restructuring of the department, "instead of the pre-existing sectors responsible for certain narrow areas of the Department's activities", new divisions appeared: the secretariat for inter-Eastern-Orthodox relations and foreign institutions, the secretariat for inter-Christian relations, the secretariat for relations between the Church and society and the administrative and financial secretariat; sectors for foreign institutions, Eastern Orthodox pilgrimage, and later the communication service and publication sector.

Since 2009

Patriarch Kirill's decentralisation 
On 31 March 2009, the Holy Synod, at its first meeting under the chairmanship of the newly elected Patriarch Kirill, reformed the DECR, forming new synodal institutions, which were entrusted with certain areas of activity previously dealt with by the DECR. The , independent from the DECR, was created; this department was responsible for "the implementation of relations with legislative bodies, political parties, professional and creative unions, and other civil society institutions in the canonical territory of the Moscow Patriarchate." Dioceses, metochions, monasteries and stavropegic parishes far abroad, which were previously under the authority of the DECR, were directly subordinated to the Patriarch of Moscow of All Russia; to manage them, the Moscow Patriarchate's Secretariat for Institutions Abroad was created. The  was created.

In 2011, on the occasion of its 65th anniversary, with funds allocated by the Saint Gregory the Theologian's Charity Foundation, the DECR facade was decorated with a mosaic image of the Blessed Virgin Mary with an omophorion in her hands.

On April 6, 2016, with the blessing of Patriarch Kirill of Moscow and All Russia, the award of the Department for External Church Relations of the Moscow Patriarchate was established: the medal of St. Mark of Ephesus.

Contemporary situation 
The status and functions of the department are determined by the Charter of the Russian Orthodox Church adopted by the Bishops' Council of the Russian Orthodox Church in 2000, in particular chapter VIII, and the charter of the department, approved by the Holy Synod in 1992 and amended in 1999 and 2001.

Role of the DECR 
The purpose, tasks and functions of the DECR are defined as follows:

Structure of the DECR
The following divisions which compose the DECR are:

Secretariats:
 Secretariat for Inter-Eastern-Orthodox Relations;
 Secretariat for Inter-Christian Relations;
 Secretariat for Interreligious Relations;
 Secretariat for Far Abroad Countries.
Sections:
 Economy Section;
Protocol Section;
Publications Section.
 Services:
Communication Service;
 Legal Service;
Language (i.e. Translation) Service.
 Commission for the Affairs of Old Believers' Parishes and for Cooperation with the Old Believers.
Branches:
Branch of the department in St. Petersburg;
Branch of the department in Ukraine.

The DECR has a number of divisions whose work is auxiliary: archive, office, warehouse, shipping.

Chairman of the DECR 
The following people have been chairmen of the DECR:

 Metropolitan Nicholas (Yarushevich) (April 4, 1946 – June 21, 1960)
 Metropolitan Nikodim (Rotov) (June 21, 1960 – May 30, 1972)
 Metropolitan Juvenal (Poyarkov) (May 30, 1972 – April 14, 1981)
 Metropolitan Philaret (Vakhromeyev) (April 14, 1981 – November 13, 1989)
 Metropolitan Kirill (Gundyaev) (November 13, 1989 – February 1, 2009)
 Archbishop Mark (Golovkov) (February 11 – March 31, 2009) (temporarily)
 Metropolitan Hilarion (Alfeyev) (March 31, 2009 – June 7, 2022)
 Metropolitan Anthony (Sevryuk) (June 7, 2022 – present)

Current leadership of the DECR 

 Metropolitan Anthony (Sevryuk) of Volokolamsk - chairman;
 Archpriest  - vice-chairman;
Archimandrite  - vice-chairman;

Notes

References

Further reading 

 Митрополит Смоленский и Калининградский Кирилл. К 55-летию Отдела внешних церковных связей Московского Патриархата. // «Церковь и время». М., 2001, стр. 7—69.
 «На службе Церкви: К 65-летию Отдела внешних церковных связей Московского Патриархата» Москва, 2011.

External links 

 Presentation on the official website of the Moscow Patriarchate (in Russian)
 Presentation on the official website of the DECR (in English)
Website of the Ukrainian branch of the DECR
Former website
Legal information
Former presentation of the DECR from before Patriarch Kirill's decentralisation, explaining the DECR's role

1946 establishments in Russia
Russian Orthodox Church in Russia
Christian organizations established in 1946